Syndemis is a genus of tortrix moths (Tortricidae). They are placed in the subfamily Tortricinae, and therein in the tribe  Archipini of which they are the type genus.

Species
 Syndemis afflictana (Walker, 1863)
 Syndemis cedricola (Diakonoff, 1974)
 Syndemis duplex Diakonoff, 1948
 Syndemis erythrothorax Diakonoff, 1944
 Syndemis labyrinthodes Diakonoff, 1956
 Syndemis miae Diakonoff, 1948
 Syndemis musculana
 Syndemis plumosa Diakonoff, 1953
 Syndemis supervacanea Razowski, 1984
 Syndemis xanthopterana Kostyuk, 1980

References

 , 2005: World catalogue of insects volume 5 Tortricidae.
 , [1825] 1816, Verz. bekannter Schmett. 382.

External links

tortricidae.com

Archipini
Tortricidae genera